The Discovery Museum is a science museum and local history museum situated in Blandford Square in Newcastle upon Tyne, England. It displays many exhibits of local history, including the ship, Turbinia. It is managed by Tyne & Wear Archives & Museums.

History 
The Discovery Museum started life in 1934 as the Municipal Museum of Science and Industry. The collections were housed in a temporary pavilion built for the 1929 North East Coast Exhibition in Exhibition Park, Newcastle.

The collections and displays grew for another forty years, until the temporary pavilion could no longer meet the museum's needs. In 1978, the museum was re-located to Blandford House, the former Co-operative Wholesale Society Headquarters for the Northern Region. Designed by Oliver, Leeson & Wood in 1899, the building had been the distribution centre for over 100 Co-op stores across the region, and contained extensive warehouse space and offices.

The museum was re-launched as Discovery Museum in 1993 at which time the Turbinia was moved from Exhibition Park. In 2004 the £13 million redevelopment of the museum was complete and the following year the venue attracted 450,000 visitors.

Exhibits
It houses the regimental museum for the Light Dragoons (and its antecedent regiments) and the Northumberland Hussars, exploring the human side of 200 years of life in the army. It is a "hands-on" museum designed to interest both children and adults. It also features examples of Joseph Swan's early lightbulbs which were invented on Tyneside.

References

External links

Discovery Museum website

Tyne & Wear Archives & Museums
Science museums in England
Regimental museums in England
Museums in Newcastle upon Tyne
Local museums in Tyne and Wear
Industry museums in England
Museums established in 1934
1934 establishments in England
Science and technology in Tyne and Wear
History of Newcastle upon Tyne